Anthrax nigriventris is a species of bee flies (insects in the family Bombyliidae).

Distribution
Mexico, United States.

References

Bombyliidae
Insects described in 1970
Diptera of North America